NVK can refer to:

 N. V. Krishnaiah, a communist politician from Andhra Pradesh, India
 Narvik Airport, Framnes, a former airport in Norway (IATA code: NVK)
 Nevskite, a lead gray mineral containing bismuth, selenium, and sulfur (mineral symbol: Nvk). See 
 Nizhnevartovskavia, a Russian airline. See List of airline codes (N) (ICAO code: NVK)
 Norsk Vandbygningskontor, a predecessor of Norwegian engineering consultancy Multiconsult
 NVK a novel by Rupert Thomson 
 Dutch Crystallographic Society, an association of the Royal Netherlands Chemical Society
 Pediatric Association of the Netherlands

See also
NVK Sakha, the largest media company in the Republic of Sakha, Russia